Fresh Out the Pen is the third solo album by American rapper and producer Cold 187um of Pomona-based hip hop group Above The Law. It was released on August 5, 2008 under RBC Records under the 'Cold187um' name after releasing two previous albums as Big Hutch. The album's title refers to Cold's release from prison following a 105-week sentence for drug trafficking.

Audio production of this record was handled by himself, Royal Krown and Tony 'Touch' Issac, and featured guest appearances from Hazmad and Royal Krown.

Track listing

Note
"May The Force Be With You" contains elements from "The Imperial March (Darth Vader's Theme)" by John Williams (1980) and "May The Force Be With You" from Star Wars Episode IV: A New Hope (1977)

Personnel 
 Gregory Fernan Hutchinson - main artist, executive producer, producer (tracks 1, 3, 5-13, 18-19), lyrics (tracks 1-2, 4-5, 7-19)
 Royal Krown - featured artist (track 15), producer (tracks 14-17)
 Hazmad - featured artist (track 7), lyrics (tracks 7, 14, 16)
 Tony 'Touch' Issac - producer (tracks 2, 4)

References

2008 albums
Cold 187um albums